San Joaquín (Spanish  for Saint Joachim) is a commune of Chile located in Santiago Province, Santiago Metropolitan Region. It is part of Greater Santiago.

Demographics
The population fell by 14.4% (16,392 persons) between the 1992 and 2002 censuses. Its 2006 projected population was 87,035.

Stats
Average annual household income: US$19,089 (PPP, 2006)
Population below poverty line: 7.4% (2006)
Regional quality of life index: 76.84, mid-high, 20 out of 52 (2005)
Human Development Index: 0.719, 92 out of 341 (2003)

Administration
As a commune, San Joaquín is a third-level administrative division of Chile administered by a municipal council, headed by an alcalde who is directly elected every four years. The 2012-2016 alcalde is Sergio Echeverría García. The communal council has the following members:
 Nelly Santander Marín (IND)
 Ramón Ortiz Seguel (PPD)
 Víctor Contreras Vicencio (IND)
 Gustavo Arias Campos (PC)
 Elizabeth Galleguillos Medina (RN)
 Cristóbal Labra Bassa (PS)
 Manuel León Huerta (PDC)
 José Contreras Silva (UDI)

Within the electoral divisions of Chile, San Joaquín is represented in the Chamber of Deputies by Felipe Salaberry (UDI) and Ximena Vidal (PPD) as part of the 25th electoral district, (together with Macul and La Granja). The commune is represented in the Senate by Soledad Alvear (PDC) and Pablo Longueira (UDI) as part of the 8th senatorial constituency (Santiago-East).

Notable people
Fabián Orellana (born 1986), professional footballer playing for SD Eibar
Arturo Vidal (born 1987), professional footballer playing for Inter Milan

References

External links

  Municipality of San Joaquín

Populated places in Santiago Province, Chile
Geography of Santiago, Chile
Communes of Chile
1981 establishments in Chile